John Edwin Merrall (7 January 1909 – 5 October 1993) was an English cricketer.  Merrall was a right-handed batsman who bowled right-arm fast-medium.  He was born at Shipley, Yorkshire.

Marrall made two first-class appearances for Surrey, both against Essex in 1931 and 1932, with both matches played at The Oval. He took a total of 6 wickets in his two appearances, which came at an average of 25.50, with best figures of 3/24. He played in the Minor Counties Championship for the Surrey Second XI from 1930 to 1933, making thirteen appearances. Playing for the second XI entitled him to be selected for the Minor Counties cricket team, with Merrall making a single first-class appearance for the team in 1934 against Oxford University at the University Parks. Incidentally he made no appearances for the Surrey Second XI in this season.

He died on the Isle of Man on 5 October 1993.

References

External links
John Merrall at ESPNcricinfo

1909 births
1993 deaths
Cricketers from Shipley, West Yorkshire
English cricketers
Surrey cricketers
Minor Counties cricketers